Taitt is the surname of

 Branford Taitt (1938 – 2013), Barbadian politician
 Doug Taitt (1902 – 1970), Major League Baseball player
 Francis M. Taitt (1862 – 1943), bishop of the Episcopal Diocese of Pennsylvania
 Laurie Taitt (1934 – 2006), British hurdler
 Lynn Taitt (1934 – 2010), Trinidad and Tobago reggae guitarist

See also 

 Tait (disambiguation)
 Tate (disambiguation)